Riesen Ludwigsburg, for sponsorship reasons MHP Riesen Ludwigsburg, is a professional basketball club that is based in Ludwigsburg, Germany. The club currently plays in the Basketball Bundesliga (BBL), the first tier of basketball in Germany.

Founded in 1960 as DJK Ludwigsburg, the club has been a regular in the BBL since the 1986–87 season, when the team promoted from the second division 2. Basketball Bundesliga. Between the period 1970–2012, the team was also known as SpVgg 07 Ludwigsburg and BSG Basket, before changing its name due to the end of the sponsorship agreement with EnBW.

History
The team was founded in 1960 as the basketball section of the multi-sports club DJK Ludwigsburg. In the 1979–80 season, the team promoted for the first time to the highest tier, the Basketball Bundesliga.  From 1970 until 1987, the club was known as SpVgg 07, as it was part of the multi-sports club SpVgg Ludwigsburg. In 1987, the team separated from SpVgg and was renamed BSG Basket Ludwigsburg.

In 2008, Ludwigsburg reached the German Cup Final for the first time, but lost to Artland Dragons, 60–74. 

In the 2016–17 season, Ludwigsburg participated in the inaugural Basketball Champions League (BCL) season, where they was eliminated by one point on aggregate in the quarter-finals by Banvit. The campaign marked Ludwigsburg's best European performance in history, as it was the first time the team reached the knock-out phase of a European competition. In the 2017–18 season, Ludwigsburg set a new European club record when it advanced to the Final Four of the Champions League, after defeating Oldenburg and Bayreuth in the 16th round and quarter-finals. This was the first time ever the club qualified for the final stage of a European tournament. Ludwigsburg lost in the semi-final to Monaco, 65–87. In the third place game, the team lost 74–85 to UCAM Murcia as it finished in the fourth place.

On 19 July 2019, David McCray announced his retirement and his number 4 was retired by Riesen, the first retired number in club history.

The 2019–20 season was altered due to the COVID-19 pandemic. In a final tournament behind closed doors in Munich, Luwdigsburg reached its first German finals ever. In the finals, it lost to Alba Berlin on aggregate in two games.

Arenas

Ludwigsburg's home arena, since 2009, is Arena Ludwigsburg, later renamed the MHP Arena, after they moved from Rundsporthalle Ludwigsburg.

Naming
Partly due to sponsorship reasons, the team has known various names in its history:

Logos

Honours

Domestic competitions
Basketball Bundesliga
Runners-up: 2019–20
BBL-Pokal
Runners-up: 2008

European competitions
Basketball Champions League
Third place (1): 2021–22
Fourth place (1): 2017–18
Final Four (2): 2018, 2022

Season by season

Players

Retired numbers

Current roster

Notable players
- Set a club record or won an individual award as a professional player.
- Played at least one official international match for his senior national team at any time.

References

External links
 

Basketball teams in Germany
Sport in Baden-Württemberg
Basketball teams established in 1960
1960 establishments in West Germany
Sport in Ludwigshafen